Rivoli United F.C. is a Jamaican football team who play in the South Central Confederation Super League.

They are based in Spanish Town and their home stadium is the Prison Oval.

History
Rivoli relegated to the second level of Jamaican football after finishing bottom in the 2005/2006 season. In June 2008 they finished runner-up in the promotion play-offs to clinch a place among the elite for the 2008/2009 season.  The team was relegated at the end of the 2009/10 season.

At the start of November, Rivoli's match against Reno was postponed because of the sudden death of midfielder Enrico Beech. In their 2015/16 season they finished second to bottom of the table being relegated to the South Central Confederation Super League.

Achievements

External links
 Team profile – Golocaljamaica

References

Football clubs in Jamaica